The Guelph  Dolomite is a geologic formation in Ohio. It preserves fossils dating back to the Silurian period.

References
 Generalized Stratigraphic Chart for Ohio

Silurian Ohio